Er Shun is a female giant panda, born at the Chongqing Zoo.

On Monday, March 25, 2013, two giant pandas Er Shun (female) and Da Mao (male) arrived at Toronto Zoo, with their exhibit (the refurbished Amur tiger exhibit) opening to the public on May 18.  The bears are on a 10-year Canada tour from the Chengdu Panda Base and Chongqing Zoo, residing in Toronto from 2013 to 2017 and at the Calgary Zoo from 2018 to 2022.  When plans were first made to bring giant pandas to Canada, Er Shun was believed to be male, and had been paired with a female from the Chengdu Research Base of Giant Panda Breeding for the journey.  Months before her departure her true sex was determined and the known female switched out for male Da Mao.  Without blood testing identifying panda sex is next to impossible until the animals reach full sexual maturity.

With the pandas' arrival, the Toronto zoo has refurbished its seasonal attraction area into an extensive educational centre - the Giant Panda Interpretive Centre.  In 2014, after her first estrus, Er Shun was artificially inseminated - the first such procedure performed on a panda in Canada.  No baby was born in 2014 and it was believed that Er Shun experienced a pseudopregnancy, a phenomenon common in giant pandas.

On October 13, 2015, Er Shun gave birth to two cubs - the first giant pandas born in Canada. One was born at 3:31 AM and weighed 187.7 g and the other was born at 3:44 AM and weighed 115 g. At this very small size, the cubs chance of survival was low. It was announced on February 5, 2016 that the panda cubs were Male (the larger panda) and Female (smaller). They were not viewed to the public until the age of 5 months. The names of the cubs are Jia Panpan (male) and Jia Yueyue (female).

On March 23, 2018, Er Shun, her cubs, and Da Mao all left the Toronto Zoo to begin a five-year stay at the Calgary Zoo, in accordance with the agreement between the Canadian and Chinese governments. In May 2020, the Calgary Zoo requested that both Er Shun and Da Mao pandas be returned to China due to the difficulty of importing bamboo during the COVID-19 pandemic.

Er Shun was born at the Chongqing Zoo on August 10, 2007 (Year of the Pig). Her mother Yalaoer (also called as Ya Ya) raised her at the zoo; her father was Ling Ling. The name Er Shun means "double smoothness" because she was the second born and they hoped for smooth and healthy growth. Er Shun's grandmother Xing Xing was in Calgary, Canada in 1988 for a friendly half year exchange.

Er Shun's character traits include being docile, lively and affectionate towards her zoo keepers.

See also
 List of giant pandas

References

Individual giant pandas
2007 animal births
Individual animals in Canada